Union Cemetery may refer to:

Canada
 Union Cemetery (Calgary), Alberta

United States

California
Placerville Union Cemetery
Union Cemetery (Redwood City, California), listed on the National Register of Historic Places (NRHP)

Connecticut
Union Cemetery (Easton, Connecticut)
Fair Haven Union Cemetery
Union Cemetery (Niantic, Connecticut), burial place of rodeo performer Tillie Baldwin

Delaware
Newark Union Burial Ground, Brandywine Hundred

Iowa
Union Cemetery Gardener's Cottage, Iowa Falls, listed on the NRHP

Maryland
Rockville Cemetery (Maryland), Rockville, sometimes referred to as "Rockville Union Cemetery"

Massachusetts
Union Cemetery, Holbrook, burial place of George Mason Lovering

New York
East Line Union Cemetery, Malta
Moravia Union Cemetery, Moravia, listed on the NRHP
Greenwood Union Cemetery, Rye and Harrison

North Carolina
Union Cemetery (Greensboro, North Carolina), listed on the NRHP

Ohio
Union Cemetery-Beatty Park, Steubenville, listed on the NRHP

Pennsylvania
Union Cemetery (Bellefonte, Pennsylvania)

Washington
Union Cemetery-Pioneer Calvary Cemetery, Tumwater, listed on the NRHP in Thurston County